The German National Road Race Championship is a cycling race organized by the German Cycling Federation. The event was established in 1910, with the women's championship starting in 1968. No competitions were held in 1914 to 1918, 1926, 1927, 1929 to 1933, 1942 to 1945 and 1973. The winners of each event are awarded with a symbolic cycling jersey.

Men

U23

Women

Road race

Mountain race

See also
German National Time Trial Championships
National road cycling championships

Notes

References

External links

Site www.cyclisme-sport.fr (National championships)
Site Mémoire du Cyclisme (National  championships)

National road cycling championships
Cycle races in Germany
Recurring sporting events established in 1910
Road Race
1910 establishments in Germany